Oberlin High School may refer to:

Oberlin High School (Louisiana), Oberlin, Louisiana, United States
Oberlin High School (Ohio), Oberlin, Ohio, United States
Oberlin High School, Jamaica